The Dark Water is a  river in south-west Hampshire, England. It flows south from a source a few metres north-east of the New Forest, reaching the sea through the end of the Beaulieu River estuary, next to the Solent, at Lepe, part of the national park.

Its drainage basin reduces towards its mouth. It drains (with its main tributary, Stock Water) most of the largely heathland forest's "Beaulieu Heath". It then drains smaller Blackwell Common (the south of which was called Blackfield Common after neighbouring Blackfield). Then it drains the similar combined area: Horsemoor Copse, West Common (a meadow) and Chale Wood, below which narrow woods line one or both of the banks, beyond an inner marshy zone.

References

New Forest
Dark Water